Sir Walter Moyle (9 March 1627 – 19 September 1701) was an English politician who sat in the House of Commons at various times between 1656 and 1660.

Moyle was the son of John Moyle of Bake, Cornwall. He was educated at Exeter College, Oxford and at Inner Temple.

In 1654, Moyle was elected Member of Parliament for Cornwall in the First Protectorate Parliament and was re-elected in 1656 for the  Second Protectorate Parliament. In 1659 he was elected MP for Lostwithiel in the Third Protectorate Parliament.

In 1660, Moyle was elected  MP for Lostwithiel in the Convention Parliament. He was knighted at Whitehall on 4 February 1664.

Moyle died in 1701 at the age of 74.

Moyle married  Thomasine Morice, daughter of Sir William Morice, the Secretary of State. His son Walter was a political writer.

References

1627 births
1701 deaths
Members of the pre-1707 English Parliament for constituencies in Cornwall
Alumni of Exeter College, Oxford
Members of the Inner Temple
People from St Germans, Cornwall
English MPs 1654–1655
English MPs 1656–1658
English MPs 1659
English MPs 1660